Mid-South Grizzlies v. NFL, 720 F.2d 772 (3d Cir. 1983), was a lawsuit filed by John F. Bassett, the owner of the World Football League's Memphis Grizzlies against the National Football League claiming that the NFL violated the antitrust laws by refusing to admit his club to their league.

The court found that the NFL had not acquired or maintained its monopoly power unlawfully and that the refusal to expand to Memphis did not contribute to its maintenance.  It further elaborated that such refusal was actually procompetitive because it left the Memphis area open to rival leagues. By the time the lawsuit had settled, Bassett had gone on to found the Tampa Bay Bandits of the United States Football League, while Memphis received the Memphis Showboats of the same league. As such, the case effectively became moot. (Incidentally, the USFL would go on to file a much more famous antitrust suit against the NFL a few years later, which while successfully decided against the NFL, provided only a cursory monetary award to the USFL; ironically, Bassett was an outspoken opponent of that lawsuit.)

See also
 American Needle, Inc. v. National Football League
 Radovich v. National Football League

References

External links

World Football League
American football in Memphis, Tennessee
Memphis Southmen
1982 in United States case law
National Football League litigation
United States Court of Appeals for the Third Circuit cases
1982 in American football
United States antitrust case law